A soccus, meaning slipper in Latin, is a loosely fitting shoe that has no ties, a sole without hobnails, and a separate leather upper. They were worn by the Ancient Romans, at first especially by comic actors (compare the cothurnus for tragic actors). Later it became popular with the general public, with several types being described in the Edict of Diocletian.

See also

Clothing in ancient Rome

References

Further reading
Soccus Brill Online 

Roman-era clothing
Historical footwear
Comedy